Manoj Sakarchand Shah (born 5 February 1955) is an Indian theatre director, actor and producer known for his works in the Gujarati theatre. He has directed over 90 plays, such as one-man plays and biographical plays, in different genres . He is known primarily for his quirky biographical plays which include: Hu Chandrakant Bakshi based on the writer of the same name, Mohan No Masalo based on Mahatma Gandhi, Apurva Avsar based on Jain mystic Shrimad Rajchandra, Mareez based on poet Mareez, Jal Jal Mare Patang based on writer-philosopher Manilal Dwivedi, Karl Marx in Kalbadevi based on German philosopher Karl Marx, and Dr. Anandibai Joshi: Like, Comment, Share based on Anandi Gopal Joshi, India's first female doctor. He produces plays under his theatre company Ideas Unlimited.

His play Mohan No Masalo was included in the Limca Book of Records for its performances in three languages (English, Hindi and Gujarati) in a single day. His biographical drama Mareez has been playing at Prithvi Theatre since 2004.

Biography
Manoj Sakarchand Shah was born on 5 February 1955 in Mumbai, India. He studied until the ninth grade at various schools in Mumbai and Ahmedabad. He began his career as a dance teacher and then as an actor. He decided to become a theatre director when he watched a play directed by Mahendra Joshi. He was inspired by the works of other theatre directors including Badal Sircar, Utpal Dutt and Vijaya Mehta. He debuted as a theatre director with his play Master Phoolmani in 1999.

Works
Shah has directed and produced over 90 plays. He produces them under his production company Ideas Unlimited.

His style has been considered innovative, and his subjects contributed to bringing a cultural renaissance in Gujarati theatre. His plays dwell on literary and spiritual themes, often featuring solo actors. His protagonists tend to be either people with quirky characters or heroes in unusual circumstances. For example, in one of his plays, Karl Marx in Kalbadevi (2012), he imagines a visit by Karl Marx to Kalbadevi, a chaotic locality in Mumbai. His one man plays have the actor soliloquising before the audience. Stagecraft is at a minimum, with the key technique one that consists of an actor interpreting his character role. His texts in this genre, theatre critic Vikram Phukan writes, are notable for their clarity.

His first play was Master Phoolmani, which was adapted from Satish Alekar's Begum Barve (1979). Scripted by Chandrakant Shah, it was first staged in 1999 at Horniman Circle Gardens, Mumbai, during the Prithvi Theatre Festival. The play is a tribute to the extinct Gujarati theatre form known as 'Bhangwadi', which was popular for its musical folk performance style. The play revolves around Manilal, who refers to himself by his stage name Phoolmani. Manilal is a 'Bhangwadi' performer who loses his bearings as the tradition fades into obscurity. But he is jolted back to reality by his despotic employer, Vallabhbhai Bhatia, for whom he sells incense and flowers. Master Phoolmani deftly knits together worlds that unfold against backdrops painted by the artist Bhupen Khakhar. Master Phoolmani also integrates some elements from the life of Jaishankar Bhojak, a 20th-century Gujarati theatre actor known for impersonating female characters. Master Phoolmani was Shah's longest running production until 2015.

In 2003, he produced Gujarat Ni Asmita, a musical drama which features 45 actors. It traces the journey of Gujarati poetry from the medieval era to the present. In 2004, his biographical play Mareez was produced. The play has been performed more than 200 times since 2012 and has  played at the Prithvi Theatre since 2004. Based on the life and works of the mid-twentieth century Gujarati poet Mareez, Vinit Shukla adapted it from Mareez's biography Mareez: Astitva Ane Vyaktitva written by Raeesh Maniar. Mareez's representation has been influenced by Vincent van Gogh's autobiographical work Dear Theo and Charles Bukowski's biopic Barfly.

Apurva Avsar (2007), written by Raju Dave and Shah, is a biographical play about Shrimad Rajchandra, known as a spiritual guide of Mahatma Gandhi. It focuses on Rajchandra's life from his childhood in a small remote village in Gujarat to his eventual renunciation of all worldly pleasures. Siddh Hem (2008) is based on Hemachandra, the Indian Jain scholar. Dharmendra Gohil played the lead character.

In 2009, he directed the biographical play Jal Jal Mare Patang based on the life of the 19th-century Gujarati philosopher and writer Manilal Dwivedi. Mummy Tu Aavi Kevi (2010) is a children's play written by Dhiruben Patel. He directed Apoorav Khela (2012), a biographical play on 17th century Jain monk Anandghan.

Mahatma Gandhi is the subject of Mohan No Masalo, a monodrama. It starred Pratik Gandhi as Mohandas Gandhi. The play recounts the early days of Mohandas Gandhi in India and South Africa before he came to be known as Mahatma. The play portrays Gandhi as a layman with extraordinary means to achieve his ends. It was staged in three languages: Gujarati (Mohan No Masalo), Hindi (Mohan Ka Masala) and English (Mohan's Masala). It premiered on 22 March 2015 at the National Centre for the Performing Arts (NCPA). Atul Dodiya created the play's set and backdrop, which featured images of a young Gandhi in black and white. The Gujarati script was written by Satya Mehta, the Hindi by Mihir Bhuta and Arpit Jain, and the English by Ishan Doshi. It recounts Gandhi's childhood and shows how it shaped his future. It was included in the Limca Book of Records for "Performance of One Play in Multiple Languages in One Day".

In 2013, he produced another biographical drama, Hu Chandrakant Bakshi. Written by Shishir Ramavat, the play focuses on Gujarati writer Chandrakant Bakshi (1932–2006). In this production, Pratik Gandhi played the lead character. The play, along with Mohan No Masalo, helped to solidify Gandhi's reputation as an actor. That year he directed Karl Marx in Kalbadevi. The play puts German philosopher Karl Marx in a hypothetical situation, asking what would happen if he arrived in Kalbadevi, a happening locality in Mumbai, in the present-day. In the production, Satchit Puranik played Marx.

Popcorn with Parsai (2014) is a biographical solo-act based on Hindi writer Harishankar Parsai. Co-written by Shah and Nilay Upadhyay, it premiered at NCPA on 6 December 2014.

Dr. Anandibai Joshi: Like, Comment, Share, a solo performance, premiered in 2017 at NCPA, is a biographical play which features a woman playing the lead for the first time in Shah's one-man plays. Written by Geeta Manek, the play is based on the life of Anandibai Joshi, India's first female doctor. Manasi Prabhakar Joshi played Anandibai Joshi's role. It asks and answers several questions regarding women's freedom. It was later staged in Hindi and Marathi, and became part of Theatre Olympics.

Plays
List of plays directed by Shah:

Footnotes

References

External links
 Official website of Ideas Unlimited theatre group

1955 births
Gujarati theatre
Indian theatre directors
Indian theatre managers and producers
Living people
People from Mumbai